Tatitlek Airport  is a state-owned public-use airport serving Tatitlek, in the Valdez-Cordova Census Area of the U.S. state of Alaska. The National Plan of Integrated Airport Systems for 2011–2015 categorized it as a general aviation facility.

Scheduled passenger service at this airport is subsidized by the United States Department of Transportation via the Essential Air Service program.

Facilities and aircraft 
Tatitlek Airport covers an area of 160 acres (65 ha) at an elevation of 62 feet (19 m) above mean sea level. It has one runway designated 12/30 with a gravel surface measuring 3,701 by 75 feet (1,128 x 23 m). There is also a seaplane landing area designated 13W/31W which measures 8,000 by 4,000 feet (2,438 x 1,219 m). For the 12-month period ending December 31, 2010, the airport had 2,350 aircraft operations, an average of 45 per week: 53% air taxi and 47% general aviation.

Airline and destinations 
The following airline offers scheduled passenger service:

Service to Anchorage was previously provided by Arctic Circle Air and Reeve Air Alaska.

Statistics

References

Other sources 

 Essential Air Service documents (Docket DOT-OST-2013-0030) from the U.S. Department of Transportation:
 Order 2013-2-22 (February 22, 2013): requesting proposals from carriers interested in providing Essential Air Service (EAS) at Tatitlek, Alaska, for a two-year period, with or without subsidy. Arctic Circle Air Service, Inc., provided scheduled passenger service to Tatitlek through April 2008 and terminated its service at that time without filing a 90-day notice of its intent to suspend that service. The carrier ceased all operations in August 2010.
 Order 2013-6-6 (June 7, 2013): re-soliciting proposals by June 20, 2013, from carriers interested in providing Essential Air Service (EAS) at Tatitlek, Alaska, for a two-year period, with or without subsidy ... for one or two round trips per week, year round, at Tatitlek.
 Order 2013-8-1 (August 2, 2013): selecting Reeve Air Alaska, LLC, to provide Essential Air Service (EAS) at Tatitlek, Alaska, with two nonstop round trips per week to Anchorage with Piper Navajo PA-31 aircraft for a two-year period for $93,080 annual subsidy. Tatitlek, Alaska: Docket 2013-0030. effective Period: October 1, 2013 to September 30, 2015.
 Order 2013-8-1 (August 23, 2013): adjusting the starting date for the inauguration of Essential Air Service by Reeve Air Alaska, LLC, to September 2, 2013.

External links
 FAA Alaska airport diagram (GIF)
 Topographic map from USGS The National Map
 Resources for this airport:
 
 
 

Airports in Chugach Census Area, Alaska
Essential Air Service